In metaphysics, haecceitism is the perspective implied by the belief that entities can have haecceity or individual essence, "a set of principles which are essential to it and distinguish it from everything else." James Ladyman characterizes haecceitism as "the claim that worlds can differ solo numero, that worlds can differ de re whilst not differing de dicto, sometimes said, that worlds can differ solely by the permutation of individuals."

Notes

Essentialism
Scotism